Baia is a commune in Suceava County, Romania.

Baia may also refer to :

Populated places and jurisdictions

In Africa
 Baia, Numidia, an ancient former city and bishopric, now a Latin catholic titular see
 Baía, Angola, town near Luanda
 Baía, Cape Verde, village on Santiago island

In Europe
 Baia, Tulcea, commune in Romania
 Baia, a village in Vărădia de Mureș Commune, Arad County, Romania
 Baia Mare, a city in Maramureș County, Romania
 Baia de Aramă, a town in Mehedinţi County, Romania
 Baia de Arieș, a town in Alba County, Romania
 Baia Sprie, a town in Maramureș County, Romania
 Baia de Criș, a commune in Hunedoara County, Romania
 Baia de Fier, a commune in Gorj County, Romania
 Baia Nouă, a village in Dubova Commune, Mehedinţi County, Romania
 Alternative name for Baiae, Italy

Rivers 
 Baia (Tisza), Romania
 Baia or Bayas (river), Spain

People with the surname Baia
 Vítor Baía, retired Portuguese footballer

Other uses
 "Baía" (Perry Como song)
 "Na Baixa do Sapateiro", a Brazilian song by Ary Barroso which was retitled "Baía" (also Bahia) for the Disney film "The Three Caballeros"
 Baia, a fictional Dhampir commune located in Omsk, Russia, in Vampire Academy

See also 
 Bahia (disambiguation), in some cases pronounced identically